Costa Atlantica is a  owned and operated by Adora Cruises. She was built in 2000 by the Kvaerner Masa-Yards Helsinki New Shipyard in Helsinki, Finland.

Costa Atlantica was sold to CSSC Carnival Cruise Shipping in late 2019.

Design and construction

Costa Atlantica was unveiled in 2000, the ship is one of four Costa ships built during the 2000s that are designed with magrodome-covered pool areas with other features that allow for travel to a wide array of destinations. The ship also has the same platform as sister line Carnival's four Spirit-class ships like . Each passenger deck on Costa Atlantica is named after a movie by the Italian director Federico Fellini. She also replicates Venice's Caffè Florian.

CSSC Carnival Cruise Shipping Ltd received its ship on 12 January 2020 marking into beginning of a China-based cruise company to server for Chinese cruise travelers with its own cruise line.

Route
Costa Atlantica sailed on 46-day voyage from Tianjin International Cruise Terminal on 30 November 2016, with more than 2,000 passengers across the two continents, and visiting 12 islands in nine countries, where Costa Atlantica completed the first China's cruise ship on the South Pacific Islands.

Incidents 

Coronavirus pandemic 

A doctor had collected samples from four suspected cases and conducted PCR tests, with three negative results and one positive. The positive case had suffered a fever beginning on 14 April. About 20 other crew members had started developing fevers in the week before the first case was reported.

Costa Atlantica had 623 crew members of 36 different nationalities, including a Japanese translator and no passengers at the time the first positive case was first reported. There were a total of 56 crew members that have had heavy contact with the positive case. They have all been quarantined, and PCR tests have been planned for all of them. The prefecture has considered requesting assistance from the Self-Defense Forces to help manage the situation.

On 22 April 2020, officials of the prefecture announced that, of the 56 additional tests conducted, an additional 33 crew members had tested positive, bringing the total number of positive cases to 34. The other 23 tests returned negative. On 23 April, it was announced that 48 tests in total have returned positive, with 14 of the positive cases being cooks or people serving food. On 24 April, officials stated that 91 people had tested positive, with one patient being hospitalized. Officials also noted that even though Costa Atlantica had been quarantined upon its arrival in Japan, with its crew ordered not to leave the quay unless they needed to visit a hospital, some crew members had left without informing the officials. On 25 April, Television Nagasaki announced that 57 new cases had been discovered, bringing the total number of positive cases to 148. With the latest cases count at 149, the ship left Nagasaki port on 31 May, bound for Manila.

Notes

References

External links
 Official website
 Video Clip of Costa Atlantica
 

1999 ships
Ships built in Helsinki
Atlantica
Panamax cruise ships